Queen Dangyeong (7 February 1487 – 27 December 1557), of the Geochang Shin clan, was a posthumous name bestowed to the wife and first queen consort of Yi Yeok, King Jungjong, the 11th Joseon monarch. She was queen consort of Joseon for seven days in September 1506, after which she was known as Deposed Queen Shin (폐비 신씨).

Life
The future Queen was born on 7 February 1487 during the reign of King Seongjong. Her father, Shin Soo-geun was member of the Geochang Shin clan. Her paternal aunt, Queen Jeinwondeok, was King Yeonsangun's primary consort. Her mother, Han Eun-gwang, who was Shin Soo-geun's second wife, was a member of the Cheongju Han clan. 

Through her mother, Lady Shin is a first cousin thrice removed of her husband. As well as a  maternal great-great-granddaughter of Princess Gyeongjeong and a maternal great-great-great-granddaughter of Queen Wongyeong and King Taejong.

In 1499 at the age of 13, she married the 12-year-old Grand Prince Jinseong, King Seongjong's second son and younger half-brother to King Yeonsan. Through her paternal aunt’s marriage, King Yeonsan is her uncle-in-law and through her own marriage, a brother-in-law.

As grand prince's wife, she received title the Princess Consort (Hangul: 부부인, Hanja: 府夫人). Her mother was given the royal title of “Internal Princess Consort Cheongwon” (Hangul: 청원부부인, Hanja: 淸原府夫人), and her father was given the royal title of “Internal Prince Ikchang, Shin Su-geun” (Hangul: 익창부원군 신수근, Hanja: 益昌府院君 愼守勤)

In 1506, King Yeonsan was deposed and on the same day, soldiers belonging to the coup leaders surrounded Grand Prince Jinseong's house. Jinseong was about to kill himself, thinking that Yeonsan had sent troops to kill him; but Princess Shin dissuaded him from taking his own life. When her husband became king (temple name: Jungjong), she became a queen consort. However because her father was the brother-in-law of Yeonsan, he was opposed to her husband’s enthronement, leading a coup against him, in which he was killed. 

Because this incident meant she was the daughter of a traitor, the Queen was deposed and expelled from the palace. When Yun Myung-hye (known as Queen Janggyeong) who was Jungjong's second queen consort died in 1515, Deposed Queen Shin’s supporters tried to suggest her reinstatement, but highly-placed officials were against the idea - one of her main supporters was poisoned and another exiled.

Deposed Queen Shin received help from Jungjong's successor, King Injong, to make her life better. 

On 27 December 1557, in the 12th year of King Myeongjong’s reign, she died without issue. The king held a portrait of Lady Shin at the funeral ceremony and she was buried in a family tomb according to the wishes of her parents. Her tomb was named Onneung. 

She continued to be addressed as Deposed Queen Shin until 230 years later, when in 1739 King Yeongjo formally and posthumously honoured her as Queen Dangyeong, as well as giving her father, her mother and her father's first wife royal titles.

Family
Parent

 Father − Shin Soo-geun (1450 – 1506) (신수근)
 1) Grandfather − Shin Seung-seon (1436 – 1502) (신승선)
 2) Great-Grandfather − Shin Jeon (신전, 愼詮)
 3) Great-Great-Grandfather − Shin Yi-chong (신이충, 愼以衷)
 2) Great-Grandmother − Lady Ahn of the Sunheung Ahn clan (증 정경부인 순흥 안씨, 贈 貞敬夫人 順興 安氏)
 1) Grandmother − Princess Jungmo, Internal Princess Consort Heungan of the Jeonju Yi clan (정경부인 중모현주 증 흥안부부인 전주 이씨, 貞敬夫人 中牟縣主 贈 興安府夫人 全州 李氏) (1435 - ?); King Sejong’s granddaughter
 Uncle -  Shin Soo-gyeom (신수겸, 愼守謙) (? - 1506)
 Aunt - Lady Kang of the Jinsan Kang clan (정부인 진산 강씨, 貞夫人 晋山 姜氏)
 Cousin - Lady Shin of the Geochang Shin clan (거창 신씨, 居昌 慎氏)
 Cousin-in-law - Gu Hui-gyeong (구희경, 具希璟)
 Aunt - Lady Jeon of the Damyang Jeon clan (정부인 담양 전씨, 貞夫人 潭陽 田氏)
 Uncle - Shin Soo-yeong (신수영, 愼守英) (? - 1506)
 Aunt - Lady Han of the Cheongju Han clan (정부인 청주 한씨, 貞夫人 淸州 韓氏); Queen Ansun's younger sister
 Cousin - Shin Hong-je (신홍제, 愼弘濟)
 Cousin - Shin Hong-yu (신홍유, 愼弘猷)
 Aunt - Lady Shin of the Geochang Shin clan (거창 신씨, 居昌 慎氏)
 Uncle - Yi Hyeong (이형, 李泂) of the Jeonju Yi clan
 Aunt - Lady Shin of the Geochang Shin clan (거창 신씨, 居昌 慎氏)
 Uncle - Nam Gyeong (남경, 南憬)
 Cousin - Nam Chi-won (남치원, 南致元)
 Cousin-in-law - Yi Ok-hwan, Princess Gyeongsun (이옥환, 李玉環; 경순옹주) (1482 - ?)
 First cousin - Nam Gi (남기, 南沂)
 Aunt - Lady Shin of the Geochang Shin clan (거창 신씨, 居昌 慎氏)
 Uncle - Ahn Hwan (안환, 安煥)
 Aunt − Queen Jeinwondeok of the Geochang Shin clan (제인원덕 신씨) (15 December 1476 - 16 May 1537)
 Uncle - Yi Yung, King Yeonsan (23 November 1476 – 20 November 1506) (조선 연산군)
 Cousin - Princess Hwisin (24 October 1491 – ?) (휘신공주)
 Cousin-in-law - Gu Moon-gyeong (구문경, 具文璟) of the Neungseong Gu clan (능성 구씨, 綾城 具氏); Gu Soo-yeong's son (구수영, 具壽永) (1456 - 1523)
 First cousin − Gu Eom (구엄, 具渰)
 Unnamed female cousin
 Unnamed male cousin (1494 – 1494)
 Cousin - Deposed Crown Prince Yi Hwang (10 January 1498 – 24 September 1506) (폐왕세자 이황)
 Unnamed cousin (1500 – ?)
 Cousin - Yi Seong, Grand Prince Changnyeong (18 June 1500 – 10 October 1506) (이성 창녕대군)
 Cousin - Grand Prince Yi In-soo (대군 이인수, 李仁壽) (1501 - 12 September 1503)
 Cousin - Grand Prince Yi Chong-soo (대군 이총수, 李聰壽) (1502 - 1503)
 Cousin - Grand Prince Yi Yeong-soo (대군 이영수, 李榮壽) (1503 - 1503)
 Mother − Han Eun-gwang, Internal Princess Consort Cheongwon of the Cheongju Han clan (한은광 청원부부인 청주 한씨, 韓銀光 淸原府夫人 淸州 韓氏) (1447 - ?); Shin Soo-geun’s second wife
 1) Grandfather − Han Chong-in (한충인, 韓忠仁) (1433 - 1504); Queen Insu’s older cousin (인수대비의 사촌 오빠)
 1) Grandmother − Lady Kim of the Andong Kim clan (정부인 안동 김씨, 貞夫人 安東 金氏)
 Stepmother − Internal Princess Consort Yeongga of the Andong Gwon clan (정경부인 증 영가부부인 안동 권씨, 貞敬夫人 贈 永嘉府夫人 安東權氏)
 Step-grandfather - Gwon Ram (권람, 權擥) (1416 - 6 February 1465)
 Step-grandmother - Princess Consort Yeongwon of the Goseong Lee clan (영원군부인 고성 이씨, 寧原郡夫人 固城 李氏) (1410 - 18 October 1491)

Sibling

 Older brother − Shin Hong-bo (신홍보)
 Brother − Shin Hong-pil (신홍필) (1487 - ?)
 Younger brother − Shin Hong-jo (신홍조, 愼弘祚) (1490 - ?)
 Sister-in-law - Lady Im of the Pungcheon Im clan (풍천 임씨)
 Nephew - Shin Sa-heon (신사헌, 愼思獻) (1520 - ?)
Nephew − Shin Sa-hyeon (신사헌, 愼思獻)
 Younger brother − Shin Hong-woo (신홍우)

Consort

 Yi Yeok, King Jungjong (조선 중종) (16 April 1488 – 29 November 1544) — No issue.
 Father-in-law - Yi Hyeol, King Seongjong (조선 성종) (19 August 1457 - 19 January 1495)
 Mother-in-law - Yun Chang-nyeon, Queen Jeonghyeon of the Paepyeong Yun clan (정현왕후 윤씨) (21 July 1462 - 13 September 1530)

In popular culture
 Portrayed by Kim Hee-jung in the 2001 SBS TV series Ladies in the Palace.
Portrayed by Yoon Suk-hwa in the 2017 SBS TV series Saimdang, Memoir of Colors.
Portrayed by Park Si-eun and Park Min-young in the 2017 KBS2 TV series Queen for Seven Days.

References

External links 

 

1487 births
1557 deaths
15th-century Korean women
16th-century Korean women
Royal consorts of the Joseon dynasty
Korean queens consort
Geochang Shin clan